Conflicts & Confusion is the second album by the American rapper Crime Boss, released in 1997. It was his most successful album, peaking at no. 25 on the Billboard 200. The album was produced by T-Mix and the duo of E-A-Ski and CMT. 

"Please Stop" was released as a single.

Critical reception
The Orange County Register wrote: "The production by Oakland's E-A-Ski is the album's high point. Most of the beats are creative, unique and not hyped-up '70s samples." The Houston Chronicle thought that "while Conflicts & Confusion'''s tales of the urban war zone break no new ground, Crime Boss' lyrical skills and the solid production lifts the overall product."

Track listing
"Intro"- 2:04  
"Conflicts and Confusion"- 2:44  
"No Friends"- 3:13  
"Chemical Imbalance"- 3:36 ft 8ball
"Warning"- 3:50 ft MJG
"Back to the Streets"- 4:11  
"Life Is Crying"- 5:02 ft NOLA 
"What Does It Mean to Be a Real Crime Boss"- 3:07  
"Close Range"- 3:17  
"Please Stop"- 2:55  
"Get up in Your Ass"- :42  
"Death Notes"- 4:23 ft Fedz 
"Get Mine"- 3:56 Thorough of SCircle, OC of the Fedz

Charts

References

External linksConflicts & Confusion'' at Discogs

1997 albums
Crime Boss (rapper) albums
Relativity Records albums